Keida, also transcribed Kida, is an Israeli outpost in the West Bank named after a genus of flower that grows in the region. It is situated just off the Allon Road, a five-minute drive east of Shilo, which is the mother-town of these outposts.  It forms one of six Israeli outposts,   built on land seized from the Palestinian villages of Jalud, Qaryut, Turmus Ayya and al-Mughayir. Among the other settlements belonging to the group at Shvut Rachel, Giv'at Har'el, Esh Kodesh, Ahiya  and Adei Ad. Keida was established without a master plan or permission to build.  The international community considers Israeli settlements in the West Bank illegal under international law, but the Israeli government disputes this.

By 2009, it comprised 35 portable homes .

History
Keida was founded in 2003. Originally, it was supposed to be built on an abandoned army base of the same name but was later moved to an adjacent hilltop. The outpost is under the jurisdiction of the Mateh Binyamin Regional Council.  The outposts in the group confiscated for Israeli settler use some 70% of the Palestinian village of Jalud's agricultural land.

There is no public transportation serving Keida. The only means of transportation are car or hitchhiking.Access is difficult, since Keida like the 5 other illegal outposts, is surrounded by several checkpoints. No journalists, Israeli or otherwise, were permitted into Keida until 2009. Though most of the outpost structures are under demolition orders, which are not implemented, as of 2018  the American tourist booking company Airbnb listed Keida as a 'neighbourhood'. with accommodation for visiting guests.{

One of its settlers, Yair Hirsch, was appointed by Avichai Mandelblit, the Attorney General of the Naftali Bennett government in  2021 to the  post of Interior Minister director general.  His residence in Keida was built in violation of Israeli building laws, and is subject to a demolition order.

Incidents
According to Palestinian testimonies, on 15 February 2011 3 settlers from Keida shot Wael Toubasy (16) in the stomach as he was walking home with his brother from their family's olive groves. Their father Mahmoud also reported being shot at by settlers from Keida in 2001 while he was driving his tractor. 
The current population of the Keida outpost consists of some 80 settler families.

Notes

Citations

Sources

External links
  

Religious Israeli settlements
Populated places established in 2003
Mateh Binyamin Regional Council